Ghorband, also known as Syagird after its main town, is a district of Parwan province, Afghanistan. Ghorband is located in the southern foothills of Hindu Kush and forms the western boundary of the ancient valley of Koh Daman. It is located 50 km from Kabul, the capital of Afghanistan. The capital lies at the town of Siah Gerd. It is the largest district of the province,  covering an area of 899 square kilometres with a population of 74,123 as of 2003. The Ghorband River flows through the district. It contains 58 Community Development Councils and 109 villages.

History
Historically the Ghorband River valley was connected with Bactria as far back as Alexander the Great times. The ancient Koh Daman valley is an important archaeological site and evidence has revealed that the people inhabiting the valley developed sophisticated mining techniques early on.

The Ghorband valley was once inhabited by the Kheshgi Dynasty of Mughals and the Hazara people.

Prominent scholars and politicians have risen from this district.  For example, Mr. Mir Ali Gouhar Ghorbandi the outspoken member of parliament during the reign of King Zahir Shah came from this district.  Mr. Mir Ali Gouhar along with a group of well-known Afghan scholars including Alama and poet Balkhi attempted an unsuccessful coup d'état against the establishment of King Zahir Shah in which Mr. Mir Ali Gouhar along with the rest of the group were caught while plotting the coup d'état.  After having served nearly 15 years as a political prisoner, Mir Ali Gouhar was subsequently elected by the people of Ghorband as their district representative and MP in the parliament. As an outspoken MP, he introduced number of positive progressive changes to the district.  Notably, he donated his own house to be used as a girl's high school.  The first of its kind the district had ever seen.  Due to his political influence, the introduction of electricity and piped running water projects were implemented in the district.  To this day, his legacy lives not only amongst the people of district, but across a wide spectrum of the public in different parts of Afghanistan, particularly in the central and northern regions.  People of Ghorband also fought Jihad in Soviet-Union attack. Prof.Mohammad Saber Khishki (پوهاند محمد صابر خویشکۍ) a very senior Venerable professor of Kabul university and a well-known personality was born in Ghorband who served Afghans in very hard circumstances of war and conflicts, continued to teach nonstop able by considering the fact that "Encouragement of higher education for our youth is critical to the success of our collective future".
. Youth are leaving no stone unturned in making Ghorband one of the pioneer province of Afghanistan.

In November 2007,  a team of facilitators from the National Area-Based Development Programme (NABDP) of the Ministry of Rural Rehabilitation and Development (MRRD) and United Nations Development Programme (UNDP) assessed the district and drew up development plans. The Taliban have been active in the district. In November 2010 it was reported that two Iranian Secret Intelligence agents arrived in Syagird town in Ghorband District and were accused by the US of helping insurgents to attack coalition forces.

After the end of the three-day Eid ceasefire announced by the Taliban, which lasted from 24 to 26 May 2020, the Taliban attacked a checkpoint in Ghorband District late in the night of 27 May. This was the first deadly attack by the Taliban after the ceasefire in the country. They set fire to the checkpoint, which killed five Afghan troops, and shot dead two others. One other soldier was injured in the attack and two others were held captive, while one Taliban attacker was also killed.

Economy

Main crops grown are almonds, apples, apricots, walnuts, mulberries, grapes, peaches, pears and other like these. Iron ore is mined in the district and transported to Charikar in the east to be smelted before arriving in Kabul. British surveyors in the 19th century reported that the district had significant reserves of iron, zinc, sulfur, and coal. A west–east road and then the north–south A76 highway connects the district to Charikar and Kabul.

See also
 Districts of Afghanistan

References

External links
Map

Districts of Parwan Province
Hazarajat